Dashtadem is a village in the Talin Municipality of the Aragatsotn Province of Armenia.

History 
The village was inhabited mainly by Azerbaijanis in the 18th and 19th centuries, and was previously referred to as Turki Talin ("Turkish Talin"), Talin Nor ("New Talin") and Talin Pokr ("Little Talin") to distinguish it from Talin, which was also called Hayi Talin ("Armenian Talin"). The population became exclusively Armenian in the early 20th century.

The village contains the large Dashtadem Fortress dating to the 10th century but substantially rebuilt in the 19th century, along with a chapel dedicated to Saint Sargis also dating to the 10th century. The fortress keep has an Arabic dedicatory inscription of 1174, written in Kufic script attributing the structure to Sultan ibn Mahmud (Shahanshah), one of the Shaddadids. Past the village to the north just east of the road to Talin, and a few hundred meters before the electric substation (south), are the ruins of a large medieval caravanserai. Large sections of walls remain standing and the overall plan is still easily distinguished amongst the ruins. The remains of Stone Age obsidian workshops can be found on a hill to the west. In a cemetery south of Dashtadem lies the restored 7th-century Saint Christopher Monastery.

Gallery

References 

  (as Nerkin Talin)
 

Populated places in Aragatsotn Province